Pricken Jansson knackar på (Dot Jansson Knocks on the Door) was the 1983 edition of Sveriges Radio's Christmas Calendar.

Plot
A girl named Pricken (Swedish for "Dot") Jansson visits an old woman every day, to listen to the woman telling stories.

Cassette tapes
The stories were also released on cassette tape the same year, read by Birgitta Valberg.

References

1983 radio programme debuts
1983 radio programme endings
Sveriges Radio's Christmas Calendar